The 1979 World Rowing Championships were World Rowing Championships that were held from 30 August – 9 September 1979 at Bled in Slovenia, Yugoslavia.

Medal summary

Men's events

Women's events

Medal table 
This table does not include the lightweight results.

Finals

Great Britain
Nine men's teams (three lightweight) and four women's teams from Great Britain competed at the championships.

References

Rowing competitions in Slovenia
World Rowing Championships
World Rowing Championships
Rowing
Rowing
World Rowing Championships
Sport in Bled
World Rowing Championships
Rowing